Scott A. Brison  (born May 10, 1967) is a Canadian former politician from Nova Scotia. Brison served as the Member of Parliament (MP) for the riding of Kings-Hants from the 1997 federal election until July 2000, then from November 2000 to February 2019. He was the first openly gay MP to sit as a member of the Progressive Conservative Party. In 2003, just days after the Progressive Conservatives and the more socially conservative Canadian Alliance voted to merge into the Conservative Party of Canada, Brison crossed the floor to join the Liberal Party.

Born in Windsor, Nova Scotia, Brison graduated from Dalhousie University. After entering Parliament in 2000, he served as the Minister of Public Works and Government Services from 2004 until 2006 in the Paul Martin government.  In 2005, he was named by the World Economic Forum (WEF) of Davos, Switzerland, as one of its "Young Global Leaders". In Opposition from 2006 to 2013, Brison has served as the Liberal Party's Finance Critic. He was President of the Treasury Board of Canada in Justin Trudeau's ministry until January 2019.

Brison announced on January 10, 2019, that he would not be standing in the 2019 federal election and stepped down from cabinet. On February 6, 2019, he announced he was resigning his seat in the House of Commons of Canada effective February 10, 2019. After leaving politics, Brison became Bank of Montreal's vice-chair of investment and corporate banking and is a member of the Canadian American Business Council's advisory board.

Early life
Brison was born in Windsor, Nova Scotia, the son of Verna Patricia (née Salter) and Clifford Brison, who ran a grocery store. He obtained a Bachelor of Commerce from Dalhousie University.  While there, he started and operated a successful business renting small fridges – he has jokingly referred to himself as a "fridge magnate".  Brison then worked in corporate sales for ten years.

Politics
He entered politics as a Progressive Conservative candidate in the Nova Scotia riding of Kings—Hants in the 1997 election. Brison was one of a handful of new PC "Young Turk" MPs (along with John Herron, André Bachand and Peter MacKay) who were considered the future youthful leadership material that would restore the ailing Tories to their glory days.

In July 2000, Brison resigned his seat so that PC leader Joe Clark could enter the House of Commons. In the interim, Brison was appointed co-chair of the Tories' Election Policy Platform Committee, and became vice-president of investment banking at Yorkton Securities in Toronto.

When the 2000 election was called in October, Clark stood for election in a Calgary, Alberta riding. Brison returned as the PC candidate in Kings—Hants, and was returned to Parliament. In 2001, he served as the party's Finance and Industry critic, and was vice-chairman of the House of Commons Finance committee. Brison came out as gay in 2002, saying that he is "not a gay politician, but a politician who happens to be gay." He became the fourth sitting Member of Parliament to do so after Svend Robinson, Réal Ménard, and Libby Davies.

Progressive Conservative leadership bid
In 2003, following Clark's retirement, Brison ran for the leadership of the Progressive Conservatives on a platform of "new ideas", that consisted  of Employment Insurance reform, more private involvement in health care, integrated defence strategy with the US, and socially liberal policies. At the leadership convention, his campaign was dealt a crucial blow by John Herron who defected to the MacKay camp. Despite gaining votes on the second ballot, Brison was eliminated by three votes and threw his support to Jim Prentice.  Prentice lost on the final ballot to Peter MacKay (who won with the support of David Orchard).  He fought publicly with other members of his party, particularly Elsie Wayne, over their opposition to same-sex marriage.

Crossing the floor

On December 10, 2003, four days after Brison voted in favour of the PCs merging with the Canadian Alliance to form the new Conservative Party of Canada, Brison announced that he would cross the floor and sit as a Liberal MP.  He stated that he had reservations about the perceived dominance of former members of the more socially conservative Canadian Alliance in the new party. Brison was criticized for this move, however, especially because he had actively supported the merger when it was first proposed. Others had also pointed out that as Finance Critic, he had been outspoken in his attacks on Paul Martin who was Finance Minister; Brison was criticized as an opportunist for switching parties and accepting a position as parliamentary secretary. Brison claimed his enthusiasm for the merger had become discernibly lukewarm in the final weeks before the vote.  He indicated that he would honour his prior commitment to support the proposal, but said that he would reconsider his allegiance once the results were announced.

Cabinet Minister
On December 13, 2003, he was appointed as a parliamentary secretary to the Prime Minister with special emphasis on Canada-U.S. Relations and sworn into the Queen's Privy Council for Canada. In the 2004 election, Brison was re-elected, his first victory as a Liberal. On July 20, 2004, Brison was named to cabinet as Minister of Public Works in Martin's post-election shuffle. In doing so, he became Canada's first openly gay cabinet minister.

As the youngest member of cabinet, Brison also served on three cabinet committees – Treasury Board, Domestic Affairs, and Expenditure Review. Previously, he had served as Vice-Chairman of the Standing Committee on Finance, been a member of the Standing Committee on Industry, the Standing Committee on Foreign Affairs and International Trade, and the Standing Committee on Government Operations and Estimates.

He is also a member of the Canada-U.S. Inter-Parliamentary Group and has served as the vice-president of the Canadian group of the Inter-Parliamentary Union where he took part in conferences in Moscow and New York. He was also part of the Canadian delegation sent to two annual meetings of the European Bank for Reconstruction and Development in London.

On November 4, 2015, he was appointed the Treasury Board President in Justin Trudeau's cabinet, a position he held until the end of 2018. In the summer of 2018, Brison initially committed to running in the 2019 federal election, however in December 2018 he decided to leave politics, around the time that he was linked to the controversy from the prosecution of Admiral Mark Norman. Norman's lawyers said that Brison "tried to have the (Davie Shipbuilding) deal killed on behalf of the Irving family – who operate rival Irving Shipbuilding." Announcing his decision to leave politics, Brison said at the time that it "feels very right" to him.

Liberal leadership bid

On April 22, 2006, Brison entered the race for the leadership of the Liberal Party of Canada.  His Liberal leadership platform emphasised both  environmentalism and economic reform calling for a "green" platform that called for personal and corporate tax cuts to prompt business growth and curb pollution. Brison won 4.0% of the vote on the first ballot with 192 delegates, leaving him in 6th place out of eight candidates.  He dropped out and threw his support behind Bob Rae. When Bob Rae dropped out on the third ballot and released his delegates, Scott Brison opted to support the politically similar Michael Ignatieff.  The final winner of the leadership convention was Stéphane Dion.

Electoral record

Personal life
It was announced in October 2005 that he and his partner Maxime Saint-Pierre, an investment advisor with RBC Dominion Securities, intended to marry.  They were married on August 18, 2007 in Brison's riding. Their daughters, Claire Brison-St. Pierre and Rose Brison-St. Pierre, were born via a surrogate mother on February 21, 2014.

References

External links

Official Site
Scott Brison

1967 births
Bank of Montreal people
Businesspeople from Nova Scotia
Canadian LGBT Members of Parliament
Dalhousie University alumni
Gay politicians
Liberal Party of Canada leadership candidates
Liberal Party of Canada MPs
Living people
Members of the House of Commons of Canada from Nova Scotia
Members of the King's Privy Council for Canada
Members of the United Church of Canada
People from Windsor, Nova Scotia
Progressive Conservative Party of Canada MPs
Members of the 27th Canadian Ministry
Members of the 29th Canadian Ministry
Progressive Conservative Party of Canada leadership candidates
21st-century Canadian LGBT people
Canadian gay men